The New Baltimore Bridge is a historic covered bridge in Allegheny Township, Somerset County, Pennsylvania. Township Route 812 crosses the Raystown Branch Juniata River on the bridge. It is one of 10 covered bridges in Somerset County.

References

Covered bridges on the National Register of Historic Places in Pennsylvania
Bridges completed in 1879
Bridges in Somerset County, Pennsylvania
National Register of Historic Places in Somerset County, Pennsylvania
Covered bridges in Somerset County, Pennsylvania
Road bridges on the National Register of Historic Places in Pennsylvania
Wooden bridges in Pennsylvania
Queen post truss bridges in the United States